The New York Intellectual Property Law Association, also known as NYIPLA, is a professional association composed primarily of experienced lawyers interested in intellectual property law. NYIPLA has a membership base of more than 1,500 intellectual property attorneys, practicing throughout the United States and abroad.

History and purposes 
NYIPLA was established on March 7, 1922, as the New York Patent Law Association (NYPLA), by a vote of the Committee on Patents and Trademarks of the New York County Lawyers Association.

The stated purposes of NYIPLA currently include promoting "development and administration of intellectual property interests," educating the public and the intellectual property bar in the law of intellectual property, and working with foreign associations to harmonize laws for the protection of intellectual property.

Membership 
The membership of NYIPLA primarily comprises lawyers who have been "admitted to practice 3 or more years in any state or territory of the United States, or in the District of Columbia, interested in intellectual property law, of good character and in good standing."

NYIPLA members include lawyers in private, corporate, and government practice, including specialized and general law firms of all sizes, as well as a variety of fields of industry. Members of the judiciary are considered honorary members by virtue of their office.  Full membership is geographically limited to individuals who live or work within the jurisdiction of the Second Circuit (New York, Connecticut, and Vermont) or in New Jersey.

Annual Dinner in Honor of the Federal Judiciary

NYIPLA's first Dinner in Honor of the Federal Judiciary was held on December 6, 1922 at the Waldorf-Astoria Hotel. The event has been held annually for over 90 years. The black-tie event, where lawyers mingle with judges, colleagues, and clients, has been called "the social high point of the year for patent attorneys," and has come to be nicknamed the "Patent Prom."

In addition to the dinner, sponsoring law firms provide hospitality suites for pre-party and post-party celebrations. According to a marketing manager for the Waldorf-Astoria, it is that hotel's largest black-tie event of the year. In 2010, about 3,000 patent lawyers and guests attended the dinner, along with 125 federal judges.

Awards presented 
Each year since 1987, NYIPLA has presented an Inventor of the Year Award to an inventor or group of inventors, in recognition of the contribution of their invention towards society as a whole. Since 2003, NYIPLA has also presented an annual Outstanding Public Service Award to one of its current or past members. The first eleven recipients of the Outstanding Public Service Award have been members of the federal judiciary.

The William C. Conner Intellectual Property Law Writing Competition was established by NYIPLA in 1999, to recognize exceptional papers submitted by law students on topics of intellectual property law.

External links

References 

Intellectual property organizations
Organizations based in New York City
1922 establishments in New York City